Carver is a surname which came to England after the Norman Conquest. The name came from the Norman French Caruier, which either derived from the Gallo-Roman Carrucarius, or from the Gaulish word Carrum meaning 'wagon' or 'cart'. Notable people with the surname include:

 Bob Carver, American physicist and audio equipment designer
 Caroline Carver (author) (born 1959), thriller writer
 Caroline Carver (actress) (born 1976), English actress
 Catharine Carver (1921–1997), American-British publisher's editor
 Dante Carver (born 1977), American actor
 Doris Carver, American computer scientist
 Frank G. Carver (1928–2017), biblical Greek scholar and translator of the New American Standard Bible
 George Carver (academic) (1888–1949), American professor of English and author
 George Carver (cricketer) (1879–1912), English cricketer
 George Washington Carver (1864–1943), American botanist and inventor
 Jeffrey Carver (born 1949), American science fiction author
 Jesse Carver (1911–2003), English football player and manager
 James Carver, British politician
 John Carver (Mayflower Pilgrim) (–1621), first governor of Plymouth Colony (Massachusetts) 
 John Carver (footballer) (born 1965), English football coach
 Jonathan Carver (1710–1780), American explorer
 Karl Carver (born 1996), British cricketer
 Lisa Crystal Carver (born 1968), writer and artist
 Lynne Carver (1916-1955), American actress
 Martin Carver (born 1941), English archaeologist
 Mary Carver (1924–2013), American actress
 Michael Carver, Baron Carver (1915–2001), British soldier and Chief of the General Staff
 Randall Carver (born 1946), American actor
 Raymond Carver (1938–1988), American short story writer and poet
 Richard Carver (architect)
 Robert Carver (composer), Scottish composer
 Robert Carver (painter) (–1791), Irish painter
 Roy James Carver (1909-1981), American philanthropist and businessman
 Steve Carver (1945–2021), American film director, producer, and photographer
 Thomas Nixon Carver (1865–1961), American economist

Fictional characters 
 Antimony Carver, the protagonist of the 2005 webcomic Gunnerkrigg Court
 Elliot Carver, the villain in the James Bond film Tomorrow Never Dies
 Ellis Carver, a police officer in HBO drama The Wire
 Holden Carver, character in the comic book series Sleeper
 Jack Carver, protagonist in the first-person shooter game Far Cry
 Jason Carver, the antagonist in Netflix tv series Stranger Things
 Jim Carver, a police officer in long-running British police drama The Bill
 Noah Carver, Blue Ranger of Power Rangers Megaforce & Super Megaforce.
 Paris Carver, wife to the villain in the James Bond film Tomorrow Never Dies
 Rex Carver, British private eye in books by Victor Canning
 Ron Carver, a fictional ADA appearing in Law & Order: Criminal Intent
 Rosie Carver, a character in the James Bond film Live and Let Die
Rubin Carver, a character from road comedy film Road Trip 
William (Bill) Carver, a character from the video game The Walking Dead: Season Two
 Zeus Carver, a black activist and John McClane's partner in the film Die Hard with a Vengeance

References